The New Haven Polo Club was in New Haven, Connecticut. The club won the Junior Polo Championship at Van Cortlandt Park on September 5, 1908.

Members
Louis Ezekiel Stoddard

References

Polo clubs in the United States
Sports venues in New Haven, Connecticut